The Tale of Squirrel Nutkin is a children's book written and illustrated by Beatrix Potter and first published by Frederick Warne & Co. in August 1903.  The story is about an impertinent  red squirrel named Nutkin and his narrow escape from an owl called Old Brown. The book followed Potter's hugely successful The Tale of Peter Rabbit, and was an instant hit. The now-familiar endpapers of the Peter Rabbit series were introduced in the book.

Squirrel Nutkin had its origins in a story and picture letter Potter sent Norah Moore, the daughter of her former governess, Annie Carter Moore. The background illustrations were modelled on Derwentwater and St. Herbert's Island in the Lake District.

One commentator has likened Squirrel Nutkin's impertinent behaviour to that of the rebellious working-class of Potter's own day, and another commentator has noted the tale's similarities to pourquoi tales and folk tales in its explanations of Squirrel Nutkin's short tail and characteristics of squirrel behaviour. An abbreviated version of the tale appeared as a segment in the 1971 ballet film, The Tales of Beatrix Potter.

Plot 
The story focuses on Nutkin, a Squirrel, and his family of Squirrels. In Autumn, preparing for Winter, Nutkin, his brother Twinkleberry, and their many cousins plan on gathering nuts at Owl Island. They sail across the lake on little rafts they have constructed out of twigs. The island is owned by an Owl named Old Brown. In exchange for letting them gather nuts at his island, the Squirrels present Old Brown with a gift of three dead Mice. Nutkin, however, dances about impertinently singing a silly riddle. Old Brown pays no attention to Nutkin, but permits the squirrels to go about their work. However, Nutkin does not help. 

The next day, the Squirrels give Old Brown a large Mole for permission to gather nuts. Nutkin continues to be rude and tell riddles. He also doesn’t help gather nuts again. On the third day, the Squirrels all go fishing and catch seven Minnows and give them to Old Brown. Nutkin again says a riddle, unnerving Old Brown. On the fourth day the Squirrels gift Old Brown with six beetles for him. Nutkin sings Old Brown a Riddle again. Old Brown begins to get annoyed. On the fifth day, the Squirrels give Old Brown lots of sweet Honey (which they have stolen from the Hive of Bumblebees). However, again Nutkin taunts Old Brown with a riddle. And Nutkin doesn’t gather nuts, he plays bowling with an apple. Eventually, on the sixth and final day, the Squirrels bring Old Brown a newly-laid egg. Though grateful with the Squirrels for all the presents, Old Brown is very annoyed at Nutkin, who continues to taunt him with riddles and has not done any work since the Squirrels started gathering nuts on the first day. The owl grabs Nutkin by the tail and drags him into his treehouse, disturbing the other Squirrels. Old Brown tries to skin Nutkin alive, however Nutkin manages to escape with all his strength. 

Though Nutkin gets away, escaping out from the top of the tree, Nutkin realises that his tail has been separated from him. Old Brown has got his tail and Nutkin will never be able to retrieve it. After this moment, Nutkin detests all riddles and if anyone ever asks him a riddle he will throw sticks and start shouting.

Composition and publication 

In 1901, Potter passed her summer holiday at the country estate of Lingholm in the Lake District and from there sent a story and picture letter about a red squirrel colony in Cumberland to Norah Moore, the daughter of her former governess, Annie Moore. She spent the summer sketching squirrels, the landscape around Lingholm, and St Herbert's Island which would eventually become Owl Island in Squirrel Nutkin. Formerly the isolated home of the anchorite monk Herbert of Derwentwater (d. 20 March 687), St Herbert's Island lies in the centre of Derwentwater south of Keswick, Cumbria. Potter sketched and photographed the island from both sides of the lake, from the shores at Lingholm. The island and its surroundings can be accurately identified from Potter's illustrations.  Potter photographed Old Brown's gnarled tree and the forest detritus in black and white. The tree stood for many years after Potter's visit.

The writer proposed at least three new books to Warne between the summer of 1901 and Christmas 1902. She enjoyed working on two or three story ideas at the same time, and, in December 1902, privately printed a tale about a poor tailor and the mice in his shop called The Tailor of Gloucester. In November 1902, a month before the private printing of The Tailor, she gave her publisher Norman Warne a version of her squirrel book. He encouraged her to continue the squirrel drawings.

In January 1903, she wrote to a former neighbour that she was busy writing a tale about squirrels, and told the grandchildren of Edward Burne-Jones that she was drawing a little squirrel at home.

The story was published in August 1903, in a deluxe edition, with a cloth cover, illustrated end-papers, and a print-run of 10,000. Sales were strong and an additional 10,000 were printed the same year.

Critical response 

Scholar M. Daphne Kutzer points out that The Tale of Squirrel Nutkin, like its companion piece, The Tailor of Gloucester, reflects Potter's interest in fairy tales, rhymes, and riddles, and sheds light on her embedded social and political themes. Like The Tailor, the tale is set in a locale dear to Potter's heart. Unlike The Tailor (but more akin to The Tale of Peter Rabbit), Squirrel Nutkin is about rebellion and its consequences.

Potter's tale, like many fairy tales, has a rural setting with a threatening figure living at the centre of a wood, and depends a good deal upon repetition: the squirrels arrive on Old Brown's island on six consecutive days, they present an offering of food to the owl on each of those six days, and at each presentation Nutkin taunts Old Brown with a sing-song riddle that suggests the repetitive rhymes or incantations found in fairy tales such as the chant to the mirror in "Snow White". Potter ends her tale, however, in a very non-traditional way: Nutkin is caught and punished rather than being required to complete a series of tasks or to outwit an antagonist. The author further breaks the traditional fairy tale mould by tacitly inviting her readers to solve the riddles—a task typically reserved for the fairy tale hero.

The squirrels gather nuts for food, and they bring food (dead mice, moles, and minnows among other things) as offerings to Old Brown. The squirrels need the nuts in Old Brown's domain but are in danger of being eaten by him. They bring the old owl foodstuffs to deflect his attention from their presence as potential meals. Issues of class structure and hierarchy play out in Potter's work and Squirrel Nutkin is not exempt: the squirrels lay their offerings at Old Brown's feet and address him with formal politeness to secure his permission to gather nuts. They thus appear as "obedient, obsequious servants of a ruler". Unlike Peter Rabbit, there are no humans in Squirrel Nutkin but there is still a sense of hierarchy, class, and power, and a desire to overturn it. Old Brown resembles the nineteenth century landowner to whom everything on the land belongs. To take it without permission was to poach and thus to invite severe penalty for poaching was not only a violation of land and property but of sovereignty as well.

Similar to Peter Rabbit, the tale began as picture and story letters for real children. Unlike Peter Rabbit's tale however, that of Squirrel Nutkin is a story about a very distinct place: the shores of Derwentwater and its environs. Squirrel Nutkin was embellished not only with Potter's favourite riddles and rhymes, but with a local legend about squirrels appearing on St Herbert's Island. The folk tale is suggested in the secret of squirrel language.

The tale differs significantly from Peter Rabbit in that the characters live in their accurately drawn natural habitat. In Squirrel Nutkin, Potter approaches more closely than in any of her other books the kind of natural history writing that was popular in her day in which a story conveyed accurate information about the natural world to young readers. Though the number of riddles were cut during the editorial process, the quality of the writing and the narrative pace nonetheless suffer from the many riddle interruptions of those retained. Potter decided to retain the violent aspects of the characters in her belief that it would be well-received by her audience of children.

References

Notes

Footnotes

Works cited

External links

Visiting Cumbria: Photographs of Lingholm, Derwent Water, and environs
 

1903 children's books
British children's books
British picture books
Squirrel Nutkin, The Tale of
Children's books adapted into films
Children's books adapted into television shows
English-language books
Fictional squirrels
Fictional owls
Forests in fiction
Islands in fiction
Squirrel Nutkin, The Tale of
Frederick Warne & Co books